Catherine Lynne McClure  (born 1952) is a British mathematics educator. In 2014 she was appointed as director of Cambridge Mathematics, a program at the University of Cambridge that spans the university's mathematics and education faculties, Cambridge Assessment, and the Cambridge University Press, and is aimed at developing a flexible tool to inform new mathematics curricula for primary and secondary mathematics education.

Education and career
McClure was born in 1952.
She has a degree from University College London and a Postgraduate Certificate in Education from the University of Oxford, and master's degrees from both the Open University and the University of Cambridge. After working as a primary and secondary mathematics teacher, she became principal lecturer in education at Oxford Brookes University and then at the University of Edinburgh. At Cambridge, she directed the NRICH and Underground Maths Projects  before being appointed to direct Cambridge Mathematics.

McClure was appointed Officer of the Order of the British Empire (OBE) in the 2022 New Year Honours for services to education.

Service
McClure was president of the Mathematical Association for 2014–2015,
and executive chair of the International Society for Design and Development in Education for 2017–2019. She has served twice on the Advisory Committee on Mathematics Education, chairs the Strategic Board of the Cambridgeshire Maths Hub and is a trustee of National Numeracy.

Publications
 Meeting the needs of your most able pupils : mathematics, 2006
 Maths problem solving, 2008

References

1952 births
Living people
British mathematicians
Women mathematicians
Mathematics educators
Alumni of University College London
Academics of Oxford Brookes University
Academics of the University of Edinburgh
Officers of the Order of the British Empire